Soz may refer to:

Sozh River
Soaz, a genre of poetry in Persian and Urdu
Saifuddin Soz, Indian professor and politician
Sonjo language of Tanzania, ISO639 code

See also
 SOZ (disambiguation)